Harold J. Stone (born Harold Hochstein, March 3, 1913November 18, 2005) was an American stage, radio, film, and television character actor.

Early life and stage career
Stone was born to a Jewish acting family. At age six, Stone debuted on stage with his father, Jacob Hochstein, in the play White Slaves. A graduate of New York University, he attended the University of Buffalo to study medicine, but he soon altered those career plans and decided, instead, to become an actor to support his mother.

After gaining considerable acting experience in various plays during the 1930s, Stone was finally cast on Broadway, where between 1939 and the early 1950s, he appeared in a series of critically acclaimed productions such as One Touch of Venus and Stalag 17. Some of his other Broadway credits include Morning Star (1939), A Bell for Adano (1944), S.S. Glencairn (1947), Abraham Cochrane (1963), Charley's Aunt (1970), and Ring Around the Bathtub (1971). Later in his career, after working extensively in films and television, Stone periodically returned to the stage, where in the 1960s and 1970s, he also directed several off-Broadway and Broadway productions, including Ernest in Love and Charley's Aunt.

Film and television
Stone made his motion-picture debut in the Alan Ladd film noir classic The Blue Dahlia (1946). He then went on to work in small but memorable roles in such films as The Harder They Fall (1956) with Humphrey Bogart, Alfred Hitchcock's The Wrong Man (1956), Somebody Up There Likes Me (1956), The Garment Jungle (1957), The Invisible Boy (1957), Spartacus (1960), The Chapman Report (1962), X: The Man with the X-ray Eyes (1963), The Greatest Story Ever Told (1965), Girl Happy (1965), The St. Valentine's Day Massacre (1967, as Frank Nitti), The Big Mouth (1967), the Danish film The Olsen Gang in a Fix (1969), The Seven Minutes (1971), Mitchell (1975), and Hardly Working (1980).

By 1949, Stone began to work increasingly on television, as well as in films. That year, he co-starred on the short-lived live television sitcom The Hartmans. He also performed as Jake Goldberg in the comedy-drama The Goldbergs and as Lieutenant Hauser in the crime series The Walter Winchell File. In 1958, he played Rafe Larkin in the episode "The Last Comanchero" on the ABC/Warner Bros. Western series Cheyenne, and the next year he co-starred as a principal investigator in the syndicated series Grand Jury. In the 1961–1962 season, Stone appeared three times in Stephen McNally's ABC crime drama Target: The Corruptors!. Then, in 1963, he appeared with Marsha Hunt in the ABC medical drama Breaking Point. In September 1964, he appeared in the Western series Bonanza in the episode "The Hostage". Also in 1964, Stone performed as the character of Greenbriar in the episode "The Fluellen Family" on the action-adventure series Daniel Boone.

In 1969–1970, Stone portrayed Hamilton Greeley in the NBC comedy series My World and Welcome to It. He also played Sam Steinberg on the 1972-1973 CBS comedy Bridget Loves Bernie, and had the role of Charlie on the CBS comedy Joe and Sons (1975-1976).

Stone eventually made more than 150 guest appearances on television series between the 1950s and mid-1980s. Some of those other series are U.S. Marshal, Stagecoach West, The Rifleman, Gunsmoke, Wagon Train, Cimarron City, The Restless Gun, The Alaskans, The Barbara Stanwyck Show, Sugarfoot, The Islanders, The Tall Man, The Roaring 20's, Empire, I Spy, The Virginian, The Untouchables, Wanted: Dead or Alive, Mr. Novak, The Twilight Zone, Route 66, Have Gun – Will Travel, The Big Valley, Trackdown (three episodes), Going My Way, Gilligan's Island, Hogan's Heroes (three episodes), Hawaii Five-O, Mannix, Get Smart, Griff, Alfred Hitchcock Presents, Welcome Back Kotter, Three's Company, Barney Miller (three episodes) and Charlie's Angels.

Personal life and death
Stone was married twice. His first wife, Jean, died in 1960. He married again in 1962, but two years later separated from his second wife. He had two sons and one daughter. Stone died on November 18, 2005, at age 92, from natural causes at the Motion Picture and Television Retirement Home in the Woodland Hills section of Los Angeles.

Awards
In 1964, Stone was nominated for an Emmy Award for Outstanding Single Performance by an Actor in a Leading Role for his role in the CBS dramatic series The Nurses.

Filmography
 The Blue Dahlia (1949)
 The Harder They Fall (1956) as Art Leavitt
 Somebody Up There Likes Me (1956) as Nick Barbella
 Back from Eternity (1956) as Dealer (uncredited)
 The Wrong Man (1956) as Det. Lt. Bowers
 Slander (1957) as Seth Jackson
 Man Afraid (1957) as Lieutenant Marlin
 The Garment Jungle (1957) as Tony
 House of Numbers (1957) as Henry Nova - Prison Guard
 The Invisible Boy (1957) as Gen. Swayne
 These Thousand Hills (1959) as Ram Butler
 Spartacus (1960) as David
 The Chapman Report (1962) as Frank Garnell
 Showdown (1963) as Lavalle
 X: The Man with the X-ray Eyes (1963) as Dr. Sam Brant
 The Greatest Story Ever Told (1965) as Gen. Varus
 Girl Happy (1965) as Big Frank
 Affair with a Killer (1966) edited a two-part episode (Don't Forget to Wipe the Blood Off) from the television series Seaway together into a feature film.
 The St. Valentine's Day Massacre (1967) as Frank Nitti
 The Big Mouth (1967) as Thor
 The Olsen Gang in a Fix (1969) as Serafimo Mozerella 
 Which Way to the Front? (1970) as General Buck
 The Seven Minutes (1971) as Judge Upshaw
 Pickup on 101 (1972) as 2nd Farmer
 The Photographer (1974) as Lt. Luther Jacoby
 The Wild McCullochs (1975) as George
 Mitchell (1975) as Tony Gallano
 Hardly Working (1980) as Frank Loucazi

Television appearances (selected)
 Wagon Train 'The Zeke Thomas Story' as Zeke Thomas (1957)
 The Rifleman, "The Home Ranch" as Oat Jackford (1958), "Trail of Hate" as "Benjamin Stark" (1960) and "The Bullet" as "The Marshall" (1963)
 Bonanza, "The Hostage" as "Chad Cord" (1964)
 Voyage to the Bottom of the Seas, "Mutiny" as "Admiral Jiggs Starke" (1965)
 The Virginian, "The Laramie Road" as "Ev Clinchy" (1965), "The Mark of a Man" as "Jake" (1966), "Ride to Delphi" as "Einar Carlson" (1966), "Death Wait" as "Grant Buchanan" (1969) and "Holocaust" as "Adam Southcort" (1970)
 The Man from U.N.C.L.E., "The It's All Greek to Me Affair" as "Stavros Macropalous" (1967)
 The Hartmans, "The Handyman" (1949)
 The Walter Winchell File, "The Decision" as "Bender" (1957) and "Death Comes in a Small Package: File #37" as "Lt. Hauser" (1959)
 Alfred Hitchcock Presents, "The Night the World Ended" as "Mr. Halloran" (1957), "Lamb to the Slaughter" as "Lieutenant Jack Noonan" (1958) and "Ambition" as "Mac Davis" (1961)
 The Restless Gun, "Sheriff Billy" as "Ben Reed" (1958)
 Wanted Dead or Alive, “The Cure” in a comedic role as the reformed town drunk "Harry Simmons" (1960)
 The Twilight Zone, "The Arrival" as "Grant Sheckly" (1961) (S3E2)
 Hogan's Heroes, "Bad Day in Berlin" as "Major Teppel", "The Defector" as "Field Marshal Rudolph Richter", "Look at the Pretty Snowflakes" as "General Strommberger"
 Gunsmoke, "He Who Lives by the Sword" as "Joe Delk" (1957), "Letter of the Law" as "Judge Rambeau" (1958), "Buffalo Hunter" as "Gatluf" (1959), "Miss Kitty" as "Horace" (1961), "Homecoming" as "Orval" (1964), "Hung High" as "Jim Downey" (1964) and "He Who Steals" as "Jeff Sutro" (1965), (but is totally left off the credits as producers listed the wrong actors and characters of the episode).
 The Big Valley, "Teacher of Outlaws", as the outlaw leader "Sam" (1966)
 Gilligan's Island, "Goodbye Old Paint" as "Alexandre Gregor Dubov" (1965)
 Get Smart, "Ship of Spies Part 1" as "Captain Groman" (1966) and "Ship of Spies Part 2" as "Captain Groman" (1966)
 Have Gun Will Travel, "A Matter Of Ethics" as "Holgate" (1957), "Helen of Abajinian" as "Samuel Abajinian" (1957) and "The Last Judgement" as "Judge Greenleaf" (1961)
 Mission: Impossible, "Blind" as "John Lawton" (1971)
 Three's Company, "The Loan Shark" as "Bernie Bustamente" (1979)
 Welcome Back, Kotter, "Kotter and Son" as "Charlie Kotter" (Gabe's father) (1977)
 Barney Miller, "Kidnapping: Part 1 and 2" as "Mr. Siegel" (1978) and "Homicide: Part 1 and 2" as "Steven Haddad" (1980)
 Trackdown, "The Witness" as "Aaron Yewcic" (1958), "The School Teacher" as "Quince Flanders" (1958) and "Fear" as "Ambrose Hooker" (1959)
 Cheyenne, "The Last Comanchero" as "Rafe Larkin" (1958) and "The Wedding Rings" as "Perez" (1962)

References

External links

 
 
 

1913 births
2005 deaths
Male actors from New York City
American male film actors
American male radio actors
American male television actors
American male stage actors
Jewish American male actors
Burials at Mount Sinai Memorial Park Cemetery
20th-century American male actors
Western (genre) television actors
New York University alumni
20th-century American Jews
21st-century American Jews